Vishnevo may refer to:
Vishnevo, Bulgaria, a village in Banite Municipality of Smolyan Province, Bulgaria
Vishnevo, Russia, a rural locality (a selo) in Belovsky District of Kursk Oblast, Russia
Vishnyeva (Vishnevo), a village in Minsk Oblast, Belarus

See also
Vyshneve, a town in Kyiv Oblast, Ukraine